Midway is a ghost town in Fulton County, Illinois, United States.

References

Geography of Fulton County, Illinois
Ghost towns in Illinois